Samuel Davis McReynolds''' (April 16, 1872 – July 11, 1939) was an American politician and judge who served as a member of the United States House of Representatives for the 3rd congressional district of Tennessee.

Biography
Born on a farm near Pikeville, Tennessee, in Bledsoe County on April 16, 1872, McReynolds attended the rural schools, People's College at Pikeville, Tennessee, and Cumberland University at Lebanon, Tennessee. He studied law, was admitted to the bar in 1893, and commenced practice at Pikeville. He married Jennie Hutchins on December 21, 1905. After her death on April 16, 1908, he married Mary Davenport on March 9, 1910, and they had one daughter, Margaret Hennrietta.

Career
In 1894 and 1896, McReynolds served as assistant district attorney of the sixth judicial circuit court of Tennessee. He moved to Chattanooga in 1896 and continued the practice of law. He was appointed judge of the criminal court for the sixth circuit of Tennessee on April 16, 1903. It was there that he heard the case State of Tennessee versus Ed Johnson, the case that later became United States v. Shipp''. He was subsequently elected and twice re-elected to the same office. He served until February 1, 1923, when he resigned, having been elected to Congress.

McReynolds was elected as a Democrat to the Sixty-eighth and to the eight succeeding Congresses. During the Seventy-second through Seventy-sixth Congresses, he was the chairman of the United States House Committee on Foreign Affairs. He served from March 4, 1923, until his death.  In 1933, he was a delegate to the International Monetary and Economic Conference at London, England.

Death
McReynolds died in Washington, D.C., on July 11, 1939. He was interred in Forest Hill Cemetery in Chattanooga, Tennessee.

See also
 List of United States Congress members who died in office (1900–49)

References

External links

1872 births
1939 deaths
People from Pikeville, Tennessee
Tennessee state court judges
Democratic Party members of the United States House of Representatives from Tennessee